Horace Alexander Young (born November 4, 1954) is an American saxophonist and flute player. He currently teaches woodwind instruments and jazz studies at Washington State University since 1998; in 2015, he was appointed to serve as chair of the Contemporary Music Program at Santa Fe University of Art and Design (SFUAD). He has performed alongside acts such as B.B. King, Bill Withers, Freddy Fender, Jonathan Butler, The Manhattans, McCoy Tyner, Nancy Wilson, Norman Brown, Regina Belle, Sam Hopkins and Toots Thielemans.

Biography
Young is a native of Houston, Texas. He started taking music lessons at eight years of age, initially on the piano but he subsequently took up the flute, saxophone and clarinet. He is an adept musician with various skills, including as a keyboardist, arranger, musical director, percussionist, producer, songwriter, woodwind instrumentalist, vocalist, author and music journalist.

Young earned his BM in Music from Texas Southern University (Houston, Texas) while a member of the Ocean of Soul and graduated in 1978 and later pursued an MA in Music at Washington State University (Pullman, Washington), which he completed in 1983. Prior to his attendance at Washington State, he studied for two years at The Shepherd School of Music/Rice University (Houston, Texas), with a focus on Flute Performance and Composition.

After more than three decades of active touring and recording, Young is now primarily a college professor/ music teacher, having taught music courses at various institutions, including the Shepherd School of Music at Rice University, High School for the Performing and Visual Arts (Houston, TX), Sonoma State University, Mason Gross School of Music at Rutgers University, Douglas MacArthur High School (Houston, Texas), and Houston Community College, Central Campus. He was formerly an associate professor at Washington State University, where his teaching focus was in Jazz Studies and Music Business. He currently directs the Texas Southern University Jazz Experience Big Band and The Joe Sample Jazz Orchestra. In 2015, Young was named as Chair of the Contemporary Music Program at Santa Fe University of Art and Design (SFUAD).

In 1997, Young developed his own record label (Design Records), which he operated until 2008, after which his recordings were released on the Pacific Coast Jazz label. Young has performed for various events throughout the world, including at major jazz festivals in Hamburg, Berlin, Munich and Leverkusen (Germany), London, Glasgow, New York, Detroit, Chicago, Houston and Seattle.

Concerts and tours
Young has appeared alongside a wide range of performers in various music genres. He has done collaborations in jazz, R&B, Christian music, urban/rap, cabaret and other types of music. He has performed with David Ruffin, The Manhattans, The Temptations, Tavares, The Four Tops, Anita Baker, B.B. King, Betty Carter, Bill Withers, Dave Liebman, Rev. E. Stewart and The Stewart Singers, Gerald Alston, Jonathan Butler, Johnny Kemp, Joe Sample, McCoy Tyner, Milt Hinton, Mista Madd, Nancy Wilson, The Ojays, Rev. Paul Jones, Regina Belle, Roberta Flack, Sam "Lightnin" Hopkins, The Chi-Lites, Scarface, The Spinners, the McCoy Tyner Big Band, Dennis Edwards, Lucy Arnaz and Yvonne Roome.

In 1993, Young conducted South Africa's National Symphony during a concert held in honour of South African pianist and composer Abdullah Ibrahim. This fete was a first in the region for a Black American, becoming the first to conduct such an orchestra. Young appeared in the 2005 documentary film Abdullah Ibrahim: A Struggle for Love, directed by Ciro Cappellari.

Recordings
Young has performed on recordings for several musicians, among them Bubbha Thomas, Freddy Fender, B.B. King, Madd Hatta, Abdullah Ibrahim, Regina Belle, Mark Ledford, Texas Johnny Brown and Youssou N'Dour.

Albums
Acoustic Contemporary Jazz

In May 2008 Young released his first solo album, entitled Acoustic Contemporary Jazz, which met with positive reviews. Released on the Pacific Coast Jazz label, this album features 12 tracks, including a remake of Luther Vandross's original "Dance With My Father". The album features collaborations with Andre Hayward, Brent Carter, Dwight Sills, Johnny Kemp and Onaje Allan Gumbs.

 "Dance With My Father"
 "Heart's Desire (In a Very Special Way)"
 "Chicken n' Waffles"
 "Joan-Capetown Flower"
 "Find Your Love"
 "Let's Lounge"
 "Glory To His Name"
 "That Kind of Girl"
 "So Special"
 "One of a Kind"
 "Danny Boy"
 "So Special (Radio Edit Instrumental)"

Personal life
Young was previously married to Phyllis Karon Gooden, with whom he had two children, Victoria-Pearl Young and Alexander Charles Young.
He was married from 1985 to 1990 to singer/recording artist Regina Belle, with whom he had a daughter, Tiy (born in 1989).

References

External links
 "The Richard Eeds Show: With Special Guests Horace Young, Paul Saltzman, and Dennis Lehane", The Richard Eeds Show - March 12, 2015, via SantaFe.com.
 "Horace Alexander Young" at Discogs.

1954 births
20th-century African-American people
21st-century African-American musicians
21st-century American saxophonists
African-American saxophonists
American jazz educators
American jazz musicians
College of Santa Fe faculty
Jazz musicians from Texas
Living people
Washington State University alumni
Washington State University faculty